Elliot Archilla (born 19 March 1946) is a Puerto Rican biathlete. He competed in the 20 km individual event at the 1988 Winter Olympics.

References

External links

1946 births
Living people
Puerto Rican male biathletes
Olympic biathletes of Puerto Rico
Biathletes at the 1988 Winter Olympics
Place of birth missing (living people)